School of Computing may refer to:

 School of Computing (Robert Gordon University)
 DIT School of Computing
 NUS School of Computing
 University of Colombo School of Computing
 University of Utah School of Computing
 School of Computing, a school in Federal University of Technology, Akure

See also
 School of Computer Science (disambiguation)
 Computer literacy